The Liverpool Medical Institution is a historic medical organisation based in Liverpool, United Kingdom. Its building on the corner of Mount Pleasant and Hope Street was opened in 1837, but the site has been used as a medical library since 1779.

History
The building is on the site of a former inn and a bowling green, which was the birthplace of the businessman and amateur scientist William Roscoe.  In 1779 a group of local doctors created the Liverpool Medical Library.  In 1833 the Liverpool Medical Society was formed.  The two societies merged as the Liverpool Medical Institution, and commissioned Clark Rampling to design a building to house it.  The building cost £4,000 
(), and was opened in 1837.  In 1907 the Council Room was remodelled by Edmund Rathbone.  The society was incorporated under a Royal Charter in 1964.  An extension was added to the building in 1966.  In 1998 a major refurbishment of the building took place.

The Liverpool Medical Institution is recorded in the National Heritage List for England as a designated Grade II* listed building.

Architecture
The building is constructed in stone, and presents a curved façade to Mount Pleasant and Hope Street.  Its architectural style is Greek Revival.  It has 16 bays.  The lateral three bays on each side are recessed and have two storeys; the rest of the building is single-storied.  The central seven bays form a recessed entrance behind six unfluted Ionic columns.  Elsewhere the bays are divided by pilasters.  The windows are sash windows.  Along the top of the building is a cornice.  Inside is a central hall, a lecture theatre, a library, a museum, and meeting rooms, all lit from above by glazed domes.

Present day
The Institution "exists to foster an environment for furthering medical and health education and knowledge".  It organises lectures and social events, runs a library, and hosts meetings of the Liverpool Medical History Society, which was founded in 1984.  It is a registered charity, and hosts the Mersey branches of the Royal College of Physicians and Royal College of General Practitioners of Great Britain. The Institution also contains an historic library, available to members and researchers, which includes an archive of rare medical books and manuscripts from the 16th century.

A portrait of Dr Richard Caton hangs in the Institution, who founded the forerunner to the Liverpool Medical Students Society, known as The Liverpool Royal Infirmary School of Medicine Debating Society (M.S.D.S.) in 1874.

See also
 Architecture of Liverpool
 Healthcare in Liverpool
 Liverpool Medical Students Society
 University of Liverpool School of Medicine

References

External links

 

Educational institutions established in 1779
1779 establishments in England
Infrastructure completed in 1837
Grade II* listed buildings in Liverpool
Education in Liverpool
Medical and health organisations based in Merseyside
Medical research institutes in the United Kingdom
Medical schools in England
Organisations based in England with royal patronage
Greek Revival architecture in the United Kingdom
Medical museums in England